Poor law may refer to:

 English Poor Laws (in England and Wales)
 German Poor Laws
 Irish Poor Laws
 Scottish Poor Laws

See also
 Poor relief